Kevin Allen Hassett (born March 20, 1962) is an American economist who is a former Senior Advisor and Chairman of the Council of Economic Advisers in the Trump administration from 2017 to 2019. He has written several books and coauthored Dow 36,000, published in 1999, which argued that the stock market was about to have a massive swing upward. Shortly thereafter, the dot-com bubble burst, causing a massive decline in stock market prices, though the Dow was soon to recover. It finally did reach 36,000 as the Covid pandemic receded in late 2021.

Hassett has worked at the American Enterprise Institute, a conservative think tank. He was John McCain's chief economic adviser in the 2000 presidential primaries, as well as economic adviser to the 2004 campaign of George W. Bush and 2008 campaign of McCain. He was an economic adviser on Mitt Romney's 2012 presidential campaign.

In the Trump administration, Hassett was the 29th Chairman of the Council of Economic Advisers from September 2017 to June 2019. He returned to the White House in 2020 to work on the administration's response to the coronavirus pandemic. Hassett did not focus on public health policy, but rather influenced the administration's response from an economic angle amid lockdowns and social distancing. Hassett built a model that indicated that COVID-19 deaths would drop off to near zero by May 2020. Hassett's model contradicted assessments by public health experts, and was widely panned by academics and commentators.

Early life and education
Hassett is a native of Greenfield, Massachusetts, where he graduated from Greenfield High School. He received a B.A. in economics from Swarthmore College and a Ph.D. in economics from the University of Pennsylvania under supervision of Alan J. Auerbach.

Career
Hassett was an assistant professor of economics at Columbia Business School from 1989 to 1993 and an associate professor there from 1993 to 1994. From 1992 to 1997, Hassett was an economist in the Division of Research and Statistics at the Federal Reserve Board of Governors. He served as a policy consultant to the United States Treasury Department during the George H. W. Bush and Bill Clinton administrations.

American Enterprise Institute 
Hassett joined AEI as a resident scholar in 1997. He worked on tax policy, fiscal policy, energy issues, and investing in the stock market. He collaborated with R. Glenn Hubbard on work on the budget surplus, income inequality, and tax reform. Hassett published papers and articles on capital taxation, the consistency of tax policy, returns on energy conservation investments, corporate taxation, telecommunications competition, the effects of taxation on wages, dividend taxation, and carbon taxes.

In 2003, Hassett was named director of economic policy studies at AEI. Hassett wrote columns in newspapers like The New York Times, The Washington Post, and The Wall Street Journal. He writes a monthly column for National Review and, since 2005, a weekly column for Bloomberg.

In 2007, Hassett argued that the United States was on the wrong side of the Laffer curve in terms of corporate tax rates. Economists and commentators characterized a graph that he used to support his argument as deceptive.

Dow 36,000 
Hassett is coauthor with James K. Glassman of Dow 36,000: The New Strategy for Profiting from the Coming Rise in the Stock Market. It was published in 1999 before the dot-com bubble burst. The book's title was based on a calculation that, in the absence of the equity premium, stock prices would be approximately four times as high as they actually were. In its introduction, Glassman and Hassett wrote that the book "will convince you of the single most important fact about stocks at the dawn of the twenty-first century: They are cheap... If you are worried about missing the market's big move upward, you will discover that it is not too late. Stocks are now in the midst of a one-time-only rise to much higher ground–to the neighborhood of 36,000 on the Dow Jones industrial average." The Dow Jones Industrial Average closed at 10,273.00 on the day of the book's publication on October 1, 1999, peaked at 11,722.98 105 days later, then declined 37.8% through October 9, 2002.

Paul Krugman argued on his faculty website that the book contained basic arithmetic errors and was "a very silly book" but regarded Hassett's role as co-author as a "youthful indiscretion." Statistician and blogger Nate Silver described the book as "charlatanic" and suggested on empirical grounds that the authors had failed to notice that at the time of writing stock prices were "as overvalued as at literally any time in American history".

Views on immigration 
According to The New York Times, Hassett's nomination by Trump to lead the Council of Economic Advisers was met with opposition by some anti-immigration groups such as Breitbart News, American Renaissance, the Center for Immigration Studies. Hassett—"like most economists ... believes that immigration spurs economic growth" even as other economists such as George Borjas at Harvard have found that immigrants lower the wages of native-born workers who must compete against them.  Prior to Hassett's nomination, President Trump "broke with recent tradition and removed the council's chairman from a cabinet-level position".

Chair of White House Council of Economic Advisors 
On September 5, 2018, Hassett released new analysis indicating that real wage growth under Trump was higher than reported, despite figures indicating that wage growth had not picked up.

On September 13, 2018, on an official visit to Ireland, when questioned if the U.S. considered Ireland as a tax haven, said that: "It's not Ireland's fault US tax law was written by someone on acid". Hassett had labeled Ireland as a tax haven on several interviews in August–December 2017, when advocating for the Tax Cuts and Jobs Act of 2017 ("TCJA"). In July 2018, Seamus Coffey, Chairperson of the Irish Fiscal Advisory Council and author of the Irish State's 2016 review of the Irish corporate tax code posted that Ireland could now see a "boom" in the onshoring of U.S. intellectual property, via the Irish Capital Allowances for Intangible Assets (CAIA) BEPS tool which is enhanced by Hassett's TCJA legislation. In February 2019, Brad Setser from the Council on Foreign Relations, wrote a New York Times article highlighting the failings of Hassett's TCJA in addressing the use of tax havens by U.S. corporates and why the TCJA incentivized U.S. corporate use of tax havens.

On June 2, 2019, it was announced that Hassett would be stepping down from his role within the coming weeks.

Return to the Trump administration 
On March 20, 2020, it was announced that Hassett will be returning to the White House on a temporary basis to advise President Trump on economic policy amid the COVID-19 pandemic. On April 15, 2020, the Trump administration announced Hassett's appointment as a senior advisor. Hassett, who has no experience in infectious disease modeling, built a model that forecast a far lower coronavirus deaths than actually happened, and additional modeling provided grim prediction about the adverse economic effects, such as a 40% reduction in GDP and unemployment numbers in the tens of millions. Hassett's model indicated that coronavirus deaths would peak in mid-April, and subsequently drop off to near zero by May 15. Hassett's model contradicts assessments by public health experts. Within the administration, Hassett encouraged the administration to re-open the economy. In early-May 2020, Hassett said there might not be a need for more coronavirus economic relief, invoking the possibility that economies in nearly all states could be re-opened by the end of May. When Hassett's model was released to the public, it was widely criticized by academics and commentators.

Bibliography
 Hassett, Kevin. "Spending, Taxes and Certainty: A Road Map to 4%", in The 4% Solution: Unleashing the Economic Growth America Needs, edited by Brendan Miniter. New York: Crown Business. 2012.
 Alan J. Auerbach and Kevin A. Hassett, eds. Toward Fundamental Tax Reform. Washington: AEI Press, 2005.
 Kevin A. Hassett. Bubbleology: The New Science of Stock Market Winners and Losers. New York: Crown Business, 2002.
 Kevin A. Hassett and R. Glenn Hubbard, eds. Inequality and Tax Policy. South Bend, Ind.: Washington: AEI Press, 2001.
  Kevin A. Hassett and R. Glenn Hubbard. Transition Costs of Fundamental Tax Reform. Washington: AEI Press, 2001.
 James K. Glassman and Kevin A. Hassett. Dow 36,000: The New Strategy for Profiting from the Coming Rise in the Stock Market. New York: Times Books, 1999.
 Kevin A. Hassett and R. Glenn Hubbard. The Magic Mountain: A Guide to Defining and Using a Budget Surplus. New York: Free Press, 1999.
 Kevin A. Hassett. Tax Policy and Investment. Washington: AEI Press, 1999.

See also
 Base erosion and profit shifting
 EU illegal State aid case against Apple in Ireland
 Double Irish arrangement.

References

External links

 Kevin Hassett bio at AEI
 
 

1962 births
Living people
21st-century American economists
American Enterprise Institute
American political consultants
Economists from Massachusetts
Columbia University faculty
People from Greenfield, Massachusetts
Senior Advisors to the President of the United States
Swarthmore College alumni
Trump administration personnel
University of Pennsylvania alumni
Chairs of the United States Council of Economic Advisers